Skog means forest in Norwegian and is the name of Norwegian rock band. It may also refer to
Skog, Sweden, a former municipality in Sweden
AT Skog, a regional forestry organisation in Norway
Norske Skog, Norwegian pulp and paper company
Skog (surname)
The Island of the Skog, a children's book by Stephen Kellogg